Roy Crossley (16 October 1923 – 2003) was an English footballer who played in the Football League for Halifax Town.

Career
Crossley was born in Hebden Bridge and joined Huddersfield Town during World War II. He made three appearances guesting for Stoke City in 1943–44. He played for Huddersfield until 1948 when he joined Halifax Town. He played 47 times for the "Shaymen" scoring 15 goals.

Career statistics

References

1923 births
2003 deaths
English footballers
Huddersfield Town A.F.C. players
Halifax Town A.F.C. players
English Football League players
Stoke City F.C. wartime guest players
Association football forwards